Wellington Secondary College is a co-educational state high school in Mulgrave, Melbourne, Victoria, Australia.

The college is divided into three Sub-Schools and six Year Levels: Junior School (7–8), Middle School (9–10) and Senior School (11–12). Distinguished former Victorian Bushrangers cricketer Brendan McArdle is a teacher at the school.

Coat-of-arms and motto 
The emblem was updated in 2002 to have a more contemporary feel than the old design, but while still retaining key elements.

 The bird, representing striving.
 The book, representing learning.
 The tree, representing the local history of the region.

The school motto is "Caring, Striving, Learning"

History 

Wellington was established in 1972 as Dingle Area High School. Its name changed to Mulgrave High School, then to Wellington High School in January 1973. Wellington was originally intended for the Dingley area, but was relocated by the Education Department to the Mulgrave area.

Principals 
Founding principal of the school was the late A.M. (Gus) Fogarty, from 1973 to 1977. M.B(Max) Peters was appointed principal in 1978 after the death of Forgarty in 1977. Max Peters retired in July 1982 and Jack Landvogt was appointed in 1984, then retired in 1986. John Coulson was appointed in 1987, and introduced the school motto (Caring, Striving, Learning) and the college crest. John Coulson retired in 2004 and the principal, Mary-Jo Putrino, was appointed. In mid 2012, Mary-Jo Putrino retired, and a new principal, Edward "Hugh" Blaikie was appointed. He has been the principal since 2012.

Houses 

The House System commenced in 1988 and the titles are derived from the names of four ships from the historic First Fleet that landed the first permanent European settlers from Great Britain in Australia two hundred years earlier in 1788 under the command of the Governor, Captain Arthur Phillip.

Each house is led by two Senior House Captains (year 12) and six Vice House Captains (years 8, 10 and 11)
Alexander (blue)
Borrowdale (yellow)
Penrhyn (green)
Sirius (red)
The most recent houses, designed by Year 7s in 2022.

 Dianella (blue)
 Acacia (yellow)
 Eucalyptus (green)
 Waratah (red)

Students participate in a number of sporting and non-sporting activities during the year to gain points towards the M.B. Peter Cup for their house. There are three major house sporting carnivals in a year. They are the Swimming, Athletics and Cross-Country carnivals.

School layout 
The school has two large courtyards surrounded by blocks of classrooms. After opening the E.H.Blaikie Vanellus Centre in 2019, the school has recently added an upgrade to B-block. The B block upgrade was adding toilets to the block, which have since been closed due to 2 student destroying the toilets with hammers that they stole from a material technology classroom. and there is currently an upgrade to C block underway, and it also has G, J, M, R, and K blocks. The school also has six basketball courts and a large open area which is referred to as the "oval", the oval is now a square due to having M block built over most of it. There is also a large multi-purpose assembly hall with adjoining change rooms and a small gym.  There was a $7.0 million upgrade to the school's facilities in 2010 to build a new junior school centre, and an upgrade to the halls that included a new performing arts centre and relocation of the school's "R" Block.

Building program
On Monday 13 July 2009 the new junior school centre (replacing "P" Block) or also referred as the "M" Block was opened, the new gymnasium is almost complete and "R" block has been relocated to make space for "M" Block. The first Gymnasium has been completed and work is currently progressing on the second gymnasium. J block and G block are currently under lock-down as renovations are taking place. Term 4 witnessed the whole of the western courtyard demolished to make way for a designer landscape courtyard complete with brick work seating and shade sales. Work is beginning on the new state of the art performing arts centre complete with 288-seat theatre. Funding has been allocated for further improvements in 2018.

The original layout of the school was a government design from the mid-1970s. this was implemented and built at various schools around the state. Brentwood Secondary Colleges original layout was that of Wellington Secondary Colleges. And a gym identical to Wellington's Original gym can be found at Mount Waverley Secondary College.

Term 2, 2019 saw the opening of the E. H. Blaikie Vanellus Centre. The new building houses the administration and front offices, the school library and classrooms, as well as a lecture space.

Term 4, 2021: A new Senior School, Well-being Centre and International building opened.

Curriculum

English
English is compulsory for all year levels, with the exception of students studying ESL (English as a Second Language).  Students undertake many varied activities in developing their skills in this subject area. At the VCE level, mainstream students can choose to study either English, Literature or English Language.

LOTE (Language Other Than English) 
The Foreign languages studied at Wellington Secondary College are Mandarin and French. It was French and Indonesian that students could study but later on Indonesian was removed making the only foreign language students could learn was French.

Students undertake French, Mandarin and ESL (English as a Second Language. Only for international students) from years 7 to 8, and have the choice to study it in years 9 and up.

Uniform 

Uniform is compulsory at the college. Student leaders wear a distinctive blazer with a special pocket that denotes their actual appointment. Students in Years 7–10 wear a royal blue jumper that features the College emblem while the senior students wear a similar navy blue jumper.
During Winter clown suits are worn, with the girls wearing a shirt and skirt or slacks and boys with shirt with trousers.
During Summer Girls wear summer dress while boys wear the same for winter excluding the tie. There is also Sports Uniform which helps identify the colour of a student's house.

Media
In the 2017-18 State Budget, it was announced that $5.5 million was allocated to the school to build a new library, technology and administration area.

Amber Truong's story and her outstanding 2017 VCE performance were covered by "The Age".

References

External links

 School Website
 School Moodle Website
 Compass Portal Website

Public high schools in Melbourne
1972 establishments in Australia
Educational institutions established in 1972
Buildings and structures in the City of Monash